Better Things may refer to:

"Better Things" (song), a song by The Kinks
"Better Things", a song by Sharon Jones and the Dap Kings from the album I Learned the Hard Way
"Better Things", a song by Halie which represented Missouri in the American Song Contest
Better Things (film), a 2008 film written and directed by Duane Hopkins
Better Things (TV series), a comedic television series starring Pamela Adlon